The Hong Kong Schools Speech Festival is one of Hong Kong's largest inter-school competitions, and is organized by the Hong Kong Schools Music and Speech Association. Primary and secondary school students across Hong Kong deliver speeches in English and Chinese. The festival has been running for the past 65 years.

It is known as one of the prime events in which primary through secondary school students have the chance to challenge themselves in spoken English. Schools see first hand the confidence gained and improvement in their students English through their participation in the event.

Events 
The following is a list of typical events (in English) each year:

 Solo Verse Speaking
 Harmonic Choral Speaking (Open)
 Choral Speaking (Non-Open)
 Prose Speaking (Open)
 Prose Reading (Non-Open)
 Bible Reading
 Public Speaking Solo
 Public Speaking Team
 Words and Movement
 Thematic Group Speaking
 Improvised Dramatic Scenes
 Shakespeare Monologue
 Solo Dramatic Performance
 Dramatic Scenes
 Dramatic Duologue
 Rehearsed Original Scene

Prizes 
Students can place 1st, 2nd, 3rd or receive certificates in Honours (90 marks or over), Merit (80 – 89 marks) and Proficiency (75 – 79 marks). Most schools in Hong Kong recognize this event to be one of the most important accolades that a student can receive and it is often mentioned in most schools list of achievements.

References

External links 
Guide to the Hong Kong Schools Speech Festival
Hong Kong Schools Music and Speech Association
Rules and Regulations, Hong Kong Schools Music and Speech Association

Education in Hong Kong